Martin Mikulič (born 14 March 1985 in Bratislava) is a retired Slovak football striker and current assistant coach of Austrian club Bruck/Leitha.

Mikulič is an alumnus of Faculty of Physical Education and Sports at Comenius University. He appears in RTVS, Slovak public broadcaster, during televised national team or club international fixtures as well as major tournaments, like UEFA Euro 2020, as an expert analyst and panel member.

References

External links
 Coaching profile at ÖFB
 Player profile at ÖFB

1985 births
Association football forwards
Living people
Slovak footballers
Slovak expatriate footballers
Slovak Super Liga players
FC Petržalka players
SC-ESV Parndorf 1919 players
ŠK Senec players
Footballers from Bratislava
Slovak expatriate sportspeople in Austria
Expatriate footballers in Austria
Slovak television people